This is a list of seasons completed by the Saryarka Karagandy. This list documents the records and playoff results for all season of the Saryarka Karagandy have completed since their inception.

Note: GP = Games played, W = Wins, L = Losses, T = Ties, OTW = Overtime/shootout wins, OTL = Overtime/shootout losses, Pts = Points, GF = Goals for, GA = Goals against

References

Saryarka Karagandy